Fujiwara no Takanobu (1142–1205) was one of the leading Japanese portrait artists of his day.

Takanobu was born in Kyoto, and was the half-brother of Fujiwara no Sadaie, one of Japan's greatest poets. Takanobu specialized in nise-e (“likeness picture”) portraits, except instead of painting on small-size paper Takanobu painted on scrolls over a meter in height and width. Only three of his works have survived, the most notable is of Minamoto no Yoritomo, the founder of the Kamakura government. Takanobu's son Nobuzane carried on the family tradition of painting.

See also
Nise-e
Yamato-e
Kamakura period

External links
 Britannica article
 Portraits of Minamoto Yoritomo, by Fujiwara Takanobu, Kyoto National Museum

Japanese portrait painters
1142 births
1205 deaths
12th-century Japanese painters
12th-century Japanese historians